The Wild Thornberrys: Rambler is an action adventure game based on Nickelodeon's The Wild Thornberrys animated series. The game was developed by Vicarious Visions and published by Mattel Interactive. It was released for Microsoft Windows in August 2000 and Game Boy Color in November 2000.

Summary
The PC version contains five mouse and keyboard controlled mini-games themed to different countries and characters from the show, including: Eliza’s Ice Hopper, Darwin’s Another Vine Mess, Donnie’s Bug Quest, Debbie’s Monkey Chaser, and Nigel’s Boomerang Tango.

The Game Boy Color version consists of six side-scrolling platformer and mini-game levels, also based on different locations and characters from the television series. This version offers a multiplayer boardgame mode via the Game Link Cable accessory.

Critical reception
The game received mixed to negative reviews. IGN gave the game a rating of 40/100. Nintendo Power gave the game a 2 out of 5.

References

2000 video games
Mattel video games
Game Boy Color games
Klasky Csupo video games
The Wild Thornberrys video games
Video games based on television series
Video games developed in the United States
Vicarious Visions games
Windows games